Events in the year 1875 in Germany.

Incumbents

National level
 Kaiser – William I
 Chancellor – Otto von Bismarck

State level

Kingdoms
 King of Bavaria – Ludwig II of Bavaria
 King of Prussia – Kaiser William I
 King of Saxony – Albert of Saxony
 King of Württemberg – Charles of Württemberg

Grand Duchies
 Grand Duke of Baden – Frederick I
 Grand Duke of Hesse – Louis III
 Grand Duke of Mecklenburg-Schwerin – Frederick Francis II
 Grand Duke of Mecklenburg-Strelitz – Frederick William
 Grand Duke of Oldenburg – Peter II
 Grand Duke of Saxe-Weimar-Eisenach – Charles Alexander

Principalities
 Schaumburg-Lippe – Adolf I, Prince of Schaumburg-Lippe
 Schwarzburg-Rudolstadt – George Albert, Prince of Schwarzburg-Rudolstadt
 Schwarzburg-Sondershausen – Günther Friedrich Karl II, Prince of Schwarzburg-Sondershausen
 Principality of Lippe – Leopold III, Prince of Lippe to 8 December, then Woldemar, Prince of Lippe
 Reuss Elder Line – Heinrich XXII, Prince Reuss of Greiz
 Reuss Younger Line – Heinrich XIV, Prince Reuss Younger Line
 Waldeck and Pyrmont – George Victor, Prince of Waldeck and Pyrmont

Duchies
 Duke of Anhalt – Frederick I, Duke of Anhalt
 Duke of Brunswick – William, Duke of Brunswick
 Duke of Saxe-Altenburg – Ernst I, Duke of Saxe-Altenburg
 Duke of Saxe-Coburg and Gotha – Ernest II, Duke of Saxe-Coburg and Gotha
 Duke of Saxe-Meiningen – Georg II, Duke of Saxe-Meiningen

Events
 22–27 May – The Gotha Program is adopted by the Social Democratic Party of Germany.
 27 May – German company Soennecken is founded
 28 June – German company Lürssen is founded
 16 August – The Hermannsdenkmal was inaugurated in Detmold.

Undated
 German company Bauer Media Group is founded
 German company Schiesser is founded
 Congregations Law
 The weekly medical journal, Deutsche Medizinische Wochenschrift, is established in Germany by Paul Börner.
 Hotel Kaiserhof opens in Berlin.

Births

 4 February – Ludwig Prandtl, German engineer (died 1953)
 6 February – Otto Gessler, German politician (died 1955)
 18 February – Wilhelm Külz, German politician (died 1948)
 26 February – Erich Koch-Weser, German lawyer and politician (died 1944)
 22 March – Hans Grimm, German writer (died 1959)
 17 May – Ernst Friedberger, German immunologist and hygienist (died 1932)
 1 June – Carl Severing, German politician (died 1952)
 6 June – Thomas Mann, German novelist, short story writer, social critic, philanthropist (died 1955)
 22 June – Johannes Baader, German architect, writer and artist (died 1955)
 3 July – Ferdinand Sauerbruch, German surgeon (died 1951)
 3 September – Ferdinand Porsche, German automotive engineer (died 1951)
 20 September – Matthias Erzberger, German politician (died 1921)
 23 September – Hedwig Wangel, German actress (died 1961)
 11 October – August Marahrens, German Protestant bishop who served as Landesbischof of the Evangelical-Lutheran Church of Hanover (died 1950)
 12 October – Emil Rudolf Weiß, German painter and poet (died 1942)
 31 October – Heinrich Thyssen, German entrepreneur and art collector (died 1947)
 4 November – Arthur Crispien, German politician (died 1946)
 20 November – Friedrich Werner von der Schulenburg, German diplomat (died 1944)
 9 December – Carl Wentzel, German farmer (died 1944)
 12 December – Gerd von Rundstedt, German field marshal (died 1953)
 14 December – Paul Löbe, German politician (died 1967)

Deaths

 4 January – Michael Deinlein, German bishop (born 1800)
 6 January – Frederick William, Elector of Hesse, German nobleman (born 1802)
 20 May – Carl Heinrich Theodor Knorr, German businessman and founder of the company Knorr (born 1800)
 4 June – Eduard Mörike, German poet (born 1804)
 18 June – Wilhelm Paul Corssen, German philologist (born 1820)
 20 June – Wilhelm Bauer, German engineer (born 1822)
 15 October – Theodor Hosemann, German painter and illustrator (born 1807)
 4 November – Robert von Mohl, German Jurist (born 1799)
 8 December – Leopold III, Prince of Lippe, German nobleman (born 1821)

References

 
Years of the 19th century in Germany
Germany
Germany